Encyclia ceratistes, also known as Epidendrum ramonense or frosted rain, is a species of orchid. It is found in Central America and the northernmost parts of South America; in areas such as Mexico, Panama, El Salvador, Honduras, Costa Rica, Columbia, and Venezuela.  E. Ceratistes prefers hot-to-cool oak and mixed hardwood forests at 330 to 1600 meters in elevation.

References

ceratistes
ceratistes